Annys is a surname. Notable people with the surname include:

Maxime Annys (born 1986), Belgian footballer and manager
Eddy Annys (born 1958), Belgian high-jumper
Cilou Annys (born 1991), Belgian model and beauty pageant contestant

See also
Annie's (disambiguation)